The Rock Paintings of Tsagaan Salaa are located in western Mongolia. Site is inside Altai Tavan Bogd National Park and was approved as part of a larger Petroglyphic Complexes of the Mongolian Altai World Heritage Site along with The Upper Tsagaan Gol Complex in 2011.

Site description
Within an area of roughly 15 km2 reside approximately 10,000 figures on the southern side of the White River Valley.  Dating from the Neolithic to the Bronze Age, this massive collection of pictorials primarily depicts livestock and big game both individual and in large herds.
These rock paintings are rich not only in their numbers, but also in meanings, expressiveness, subject and compositions. They are important monuments of the art of the transition from ancient hunter-gatherer societies to livestock breeding and the beginning of the classic nomad economy in Mongolia.

World Heritage status
This site was added to the UNESCO World Heritage Tentative List on August 1, 1996 in the Cultural category.

References

External links
Tsagaan salaa rock painting - UNESCO World Heritage Centre Accessed 2009-03-02.
Rock art in Mongolia
World Heritage Tentative List